Road 49 is the road connecting the Azerbaijan border from Astara to Qazvin and Tehran; and from Saveh to Road 65.

It crosses the western Alborz mountain range.

References

External links 

 Iran road map on Young Journalists Club

49
Transportation in Gilan Province
Transportation in Markazi Province
Transportation in Qazvin Province
Alborz (mountain range)